Nick Kuipers (born 12 December 1988) is a Dutch footballer who plays as a left back for Dutch lower league side Go Ahead Kampen.

Club career

Early career
Kuipers was born in Heemskerk, North Holland. He started playing football, at amateur team Hollandia-T in Tuitjenhorn. Here it was clear that Kuipers had a special talent, and therefore he moved to Saturday-amateur team AFC '34 in Alkmaar, who were one of the bigger amateur teams in Netherlands. HFC Haarlem saw his potential, and signed him for their youth squad. Here, he developed so good, that FC Utrecht, were keen to sign him for their reserve squad. His professional debut was right around the corner.

Utrecht
On 30 December 2007, Kuipers had his professional debut in a 2–2 draw against Vitesse Arnhem. Since then, Kuipers played occasionally, and he has been a part of FC Utrecht's first squad.

In the beginning of 2009, he signed on loan until the end of the 2008–09 season for FC Zwolle to gain more experience.

External links
 
  - Kuipers stats at VI.nl

1988 births
Living people
People from Heemskerk
Association football fullbacks
Dutch footballers
Eredivisie players
Eerste Divisie players
Derde Divisie players
FC Utrecht players
PEC Zwolle players
FC Dordrecht players
Rijnsburgse Boys players
ASV De Dijk players
AFC '34 players
Footballers from North Holland